Food Network, formerly called Food Network Canada, is a Canadian English language specialty channel based on the U.S. cable network of the same name. It airs programming related to food, cooking, cuisine, and the food industry. The Canadian version of Food Network is a joint venture between Corus Entertainment and the U.S. network's parent company Television Food Network, G.P. (which is majority-owned by Warner Bros. Discovery).

History
The U.S. Food Network was available in Canada since 1997 and became one of the more popular foreign cable channels available in Canada. This prompted the creation of a Canadian version which would then be able to access ad revenue through commercials under Canadian Radio-television and Telecommunications Commission (CRTC) regulations. Corus Entertainment and Alliance Atlantis launched the channel on October 9, 2000 at 6:00 a.m. EST.

The licence for Food Network Canada was approved by the CRTC in early 2000. The channel was launched in October of that year; on the day of the launch, the U.S. service was removed from the list of foreign channels eligible to be broadcast in Canada.

On January 18, 2008, a joint venture between Canwest and Goldman Sachs Capital Partners known as CW Media bought Alliance Atlantis and gained AAC's interest in Food Network.

On October 27, 2010, ownership changed again as Shaw Communications gained control of Food Network as a result of its acquisition of Canwest and Goldman Sachs' interest in CW Media. On March 4, 2013, Corus Entertainment (also controlled by the Shaw family) announced the sale of its 22.58% ownership interest in Food Network to Shaw Media, in exchange for Shaw's 49% stake in ABC Spark. The sale closed in April 2013.

On April 1, 2016, Shaw Media was subsumed into Corus as part of a corporate reorganization, which reunited Food Network with the active Corus channels.

Food Network HD

On October 5, 2011, Shaw Media launched Food Network HD, a 1080i high definition simulcast of the standard definition feed. It is available through all major TV providers.

See also
 Canadian cuisine
 Cooking Channel (Canadian TV channel)
 DIY Network
 HGTV
 Food Network
 Food Network (Australia)
 Food Network (New Zealand)
 Food Network Asia
 List of Food Network Canada personalities
 List of programs broadcast by Food Network Canada

References

External links
 
 Adams, Liz; Food Network cooks up Canadian menu; Strategy Magazine; 07/17/2000.
 Decision CRTC 2000-217; CRTC; 07/04/2000.

 
Canada
Television channels and stations established in 2000
Corus Entertainment networks
Analog cable television networks in Canada
English-language television stations in Canada
2000 establishments in Canada
Television channel articles with incorrect naming style